Nagdhunga tunnel is a highway tunnel connecting Sisnekhola of Dhading district and Nagdhunga in Kathmandu.  The tunnel will be a part of Tribhuvan Highway. The contractor of the project is Hazama Ando Corporation. The project is scheduled to be finished by April 2023. 

The tunnel has a height of 8.3m and have a lane of 9.5m wide. The length of the tunnel is 2680 m. The cost estimate of the project is about NPR 22 billion.

Geology
The tunnel passes through bedrocks of Sopyang formation. There are six shear zones in the alignment.

Features 

 Tunnel,  2.688 km, 2 lanes, carriageway width 9.5 m, grade 3.5%
 Approach road, 2.60 km, 2 lanes, carriageway width 7m, 2 m shoulder
 Bridge, 2
 Toll facility, west side 3 booths, 3 lanes each and east side 2 booths, 2 lanes each
 Tunnel management office, west side area 390 m2 and east side 300 m2
 Disposal area development at the east portal;
 Transmission line 4.14 km.

See also
List of tunnels in Nepal

References

Kathmandu
Road tunnels in Nepal
Buildings and structures in Dhading District
Buildings and structures in Kathmandu District